Barboursville is a village in Cabell County, West Virginia. It is located near the second largest city in the state, Huntington. The population was 4,258 in the 2019 census estimate. Barboursville is a part of the Huntington–Ashland metropolitan area.

History
Barboursville was platted in 1813.

The Barboursville Historic District was listed on the National Register of Historic Places in 2008. The Thornburg House was separately listed in 1991. Barboursville also contains the historic Miller House, a building constructed in 1835 by local pioneer William Clendenin Miller, grandson of Major George Clendenin (Served under Lt. Colonel Daniel Boone in the 1774 Battle of Point Pleasant, and along with Boone was the first representative of Kanawha County, and incidentally what would become Cabell County. Also was a co-founder of Charleston, West Virginia.)

Geography
Barboursville is located at  (38.411002, -82.297758). 
The confluence of the Mud River and the Guyandotte River is just north of the village.

Demographics

2010 census
As of the census of 2010, there were 3,964 people, 1,528 households, and 904 families living in the village. The racial makeup of the village was 94.1% White, 3.1% African American, 0.2% Native American, 1.3% Asian, 0.1% from other races, and 1.2% from two or more races. Hispanic or Latino of any race were 0.7% of the population.

There were 1,528 households, of which 25.3% had children under the age of 18 living with them, 43.2% were married couples living together, 11.9% had a female householder with no husband present, 4.1% had a male householder with no wife present, and 40.8% were non-families. 36.4% of all households were made up of individuals, and 14.6% had someone living alone who was 65 years of age or older. The average household size was 2.12 and the average family size was 2.76.

The median age in the village was 38.8 years. 16.8% of residents were under the age of 18; 9.3% were between the ages of 18 and 24; 30.4% were from 25 to 44; 25.8% were from 45 to 64; and 17.5% were 65 years of age or older. The gender makeup of the village was 52.7% male and 47.3% female.

2000 census
As of the census of 2000, there were 3,183 people, 1,365 households, and 877 families living in the village. The population density was 864.1 people per square mile (334.0/km2). There were 1,465 housing units at an average density of 397.7 per square mile (153.7/km2). The racial makeup of the village was 97.77% White, 0.82% African American, 0.16% Native American, 0.60% Asian, 0.06% Pacific Islander, 0.06% from other races, and 0.53% from two or more races. Hispanic or Latino of any race were 0.72% of the population.

There were 1,365 households, out of which 25.9% had children under the age of 18 living with them, 51.1% were married couples living together, 10.5% had a female householder with no husband present, and 35.7% were non-families. 31.2% of all households were made up of individuals, and 14.1% had someone living alone who was 65 years of age or older. The average household size was 2.25 and the average family size was 2.82.

In the village, the population was spread out, with 19.4% under the age of 18, 9.9% from 18 to 24, 26.1% from 25 to 44, 27.2% from 45 to 64, and 17.5% who were 65 years of age or older. The median age was 42 years. For every 100 females, there were 94.4 males. For every 100 females age 18 and over, there were 90.7 males.

The median income for a household in the village was $35,139, and the median income for a family was $45,167. Males had a median income of $32,952 versus $26,469 for females. The per capita income for the village was $19,848. About 5.4% of families and 10.0% of the population were below the poverty line, including 8.5% of those under age 18 and 7.1% of those age 65 or over.

Business 
Barboursville is home to the Huntington Mall, which is the largest indoor mall in the state of West Virginia, with more than 1.5 million square feet of retail space. The mall is anchored by Macy's, JCPenney, Sears, Books-A-Million, Field & Stream, TJMaxx, HomeGoods and Dick's Sporting Goods.

Another busy retail area in Barboursville is the Merritt's Creek Farm Shopping Center just off I-64 Exit 18. The development contains a Target, Home Depot, Office Depot, Petco, Marshalls, Dress Barn, Starbucks, Massage Envy, O'Charleys, Orange Theory Fitness, Bellacinos, Game Stop, and numerous other smaller tenants.

There have been two recently announced major retail developments for the Barboursville area. In 2015, Interstate Realty, of Bristol, TN, announced plans to construct a new retail development named Tanyard Station. The development will be built on a 52-acre site that was formerly a CSX rail yard along US Route 60. It is slated to be one of the largest retail developments ever built in Cabell County with over 400,000 square feet of planned retail space. It will be home to approximately 20 restaurants and retailers, including a grocery store, hotel, bank, gas station, and many others. Since its announcement, the development has been plagued by many delays and setbacks including an endangered bat species being found on the property. To accommodate the development, US Route 60 will be widened and intersection upgrades will be made and will include installation of several new traffic lights and signals. An official groundbreaking for the development was held on October 16, 2017 with the announcement of the first four tenants being Menards, ALDI, LongHorn Steakhouse, and Sheetz.

Another major retail development known as The Crossing has also been announced to be constructed less than one mile from the Tanyard Station development just off the Big Ben Bowen Highway (WV Route 193). The development has been described as "upscale retail, restaurants, and lodging." It was recently announced that the developer hoped to have Phase 1 of the project, which would contain approximately 16 tenants, open by the end of 2017.

Emergency services 

Due to the tax base afforded by the Huntington Mall, the Village of Barboursville can afford a high degree of police protection. Fire services are provided by a volunteer fire department. Medical transport is provided by the county EMS. There are two hospitals in the nearby city of Huntington, St. Mary's Medical Center and Cabell-Huntington Hospital, both of which are Level 2 trauma centers and affiliated with the Marshall University Joan C. Edwards School of Medicine.

Education 
Young people in Barboursville are educated by the schools of the Cabell County Board of Education. In 1994, the board consolidated most of its schools into a few large facilities. Primary education is given at Village of Barboursville Elementary, which is a consolidation of Pea Ridge Elementary and Barboursville Elementary. Also Martha Elementary, on Martha Rd. Davis Creek Elementary is an additional school that is available to residents of Barboursville. This school can be found off Davis Creek Road and Alternate 10. High school students began attending Cabell Midland High School, a facility resulting from the consolidation of Barboursville High School and Milton High School, in the fall of 1994. Cabell Midland High School is in Ona, about five miles east of Barboursville.

Technical and trade education for Barboursville public school students is administered by the Cabell County Career Technology Center in Huntington; the CCCTC offers courses in automotive mechanics, HVAC, welding, nursing, and information technology. Classes are also available to adults as college-level courses.

University courses are available through Marshall University and Mountwest Community and Technical College in Huntington.

Landmarks 

There is a trail through Barboursville that showcases many of its historic buildings. One such structure is an old toll house dating to the pre-Civil War era. Other landmarks include the Veterans' Home, Barboursville Elementary and Middle Schools (both schools have been rebuilt), and Barboursville Park, which serves as a popular recreation area for residents of the area.

Barboursville is located near U.S. Route 60, which follows the route of the historic Midland Trail.

The Barboursville Park is another major attraction within the Village. It encompasses more than 750 acres and has soccer and baseball fields, tennis courts, basketball courts, fishing ponds, walking trails, equestrian trails, horse show ring, and amphitheater. There is also a newly opened splash pad and plans have been announced to build a disc golf course. The U.S. Youth Soccer Region 1 Championship was held at the soccer complex within Barboursville Park in 2015 and 2016. Also hosted was the U.S. Youth Soccer Region 1 President's Cup in 2017.

Lake William in the Barboursville Park is a 17-acre impoundment located on the City Barboursville's Community Park in Cabell County. Access to the lake is by County Route 31 and 31.

Notable people 

 John Astle, member of the Maryland General Assembly
 George Baumgardner, MLB pitcher
 Wayne Chapman, NFL football player and coach
 Grace Golden Clayton, originator of Father's Day
 William Hope Harvey, lawyer, author, politician, and businessman
 Brett Rowe, stock car racing driver
 Catherine Shipe East, researcher and feminist activist
 Jason Starkey, NFL player
 David A. Wiley, academic and writer

References

Villages in Cabell County, West Virginia
Populated places on the Guyandotte River
Former county seats in West Virginia